Roadburn Festival is an international music festival held in Tilburg, Netherlands every April since 1999. It was set up as a spin-off from the Roadburn music blog founded by Jurgen van den Brand and Walter Hoeijmakers. Originally focused on stoner rock, Roadburn grew into a major event spanning the entire spectrum of heavy rock and experimental music. The key staff involved with running the festival are Frens Frijns (managing director, CEO of Tilburg's 013 venue), Walter Hoeijmakers (promoter, artistic director) and Becky Laverty (press, communication, side programme).

Since 2014, Roadburn Festival publishes a daily fanzine that is distributed freely to its attendees. The fanzine is titled Weirdo Canyon Dispatch and is edited by JJ Koczan, one of the principal live photographers of the festival and the editor of The Obelisk webzine.

The first edition of the festival was held the 13th of February, 1999. Its line-up featured: Cathedral, Orange Goblin, Beaver, Celestial Season, Terra Firma and 35007.

References

External links

 

Heavy metal festivals in the Netherlands
Rock festivals in the Netherlands
Experimental music festivals
Music festivals established in 1995
1995 establishments in the Netherlands
Music in Tilburg